Swimming was contested at the 1958 Asian Games in Metropolitan Indoor Swimming Pool, Tokyo, Japan from 28 to 31 May 1958.

Medalists

Men

Women

Medal table

References 
 Sports 123: Asian Games

External links 
 Third Asian Games Tokyo 1958

 
1958 Asian Games events
1958
Asian Games
Swimming competitions in Japan